Paulo Jorge may refer to:
Paulo Teixeira Jorge (1934–2010),  Foreign Minister of Angola from 1976 to 1984
Paulo Jorge (footballer, born 1963), Portuguese football forward
Paulo Jorge (footballer, born 1970), Angolan football goalkeeper
Paulo Jorge (footballer, born 1980), Portuguese football defender
Paulo Jorge (footballer, born 1981), Portuguese football midfielder
Paulo Jorge (footballer, born 1993), Portuguese football midfielder

See also